Fautrix is a genus of sea snails, marine gastropod mollusks in the family Calliostomatidae.

Species
Species within the genus Fautrix include:
 Fautrix aquilonia Marshall, 1995
 Fautrix candida Marshall, 1995

References

 Marshall, B.A. (1995). Calliostomatidae (Gastropoda: Trochoidea) from New Caledonia, the Loyalty Islands and the northern Lord Howe Rise. pp. 381–458 in Bouchet, P. (ed.). Résultats des Campagnes MUSORSTOM, Vol. 14 . Mém. Mus. nat. Hist. nat. 167 : 381-458
 Marshall, B. A. (2016). New species of Venustatrochus Powell, 1951 from New Zealand, and new species of Falsimargarita Powell, 1951 and a new genus of the Calliostomatidae from the southwest Pacific, with comments on some other calliostomatid genera (Mollusca: Gastropoda). Molluscan Research. 36: 119–141.

External links

 
Calliostomatidae